The Basilian Aleppian Sisters is a religious order of the Melkite Greek Catholic Church and considered as the female branch of the Basilian Aleppian Order. 

The order was founded in 1740.

References

Melkite Greek Catholic Church
Catholic female orders and societies